Parfyonovo is a rural locality (a village) and the administrative center of Roksomskoye Rural Settlement, Vashkinsky District, Vologda Oblast, Russia. The population was 179 as of 2002.

Geography 
Parfyonovo is located 31 km northeast of Lipin Bor (the district's administrative centre) by road. Timino is the nearest rural locality.

References 

Rural localities in Vashkinsky District